Valdengo is a comune (municipality) in the Province of Biella in the Italian region Piedmont, located about  northeast of Turin and about  southeast of Biella.

Valdengo borders the following municipalities: Candelo, Cerreto Castello, Piatto, Quaregna, Ronco Biellese, Ternengo, Vigliano Biellese.

Demographic evolution

References

Cities and towns in Piedmont